Cvetana Dekleva (born April 24, 1963) is a Yugoslav and Slovenian former female basketball player.

External links
Profile at sports-reference.com

1963 births
Living people
Sportspeople from Subotica
Slovenian women's basketball players
ŽKK Partizan players
Olympic basketball players of Yugoslavia
Basketball players at the 1984 Summer Olympics
Yugoslav women's basketball players